Altererythrobacter is a bacterial genus from the family Erythrobacteraceae.

Species

Accepted species
Altererythrobacter comprises the following species:

 Altererythrobacter aquiaggeris Jung et al. 2017

 Altererythrobacter deserti Yan et al. 2017

 Altererythrobacter epoxidivorans Kwon et al. 2007
 Altererythrobacter estronivorus Qin et al. 2021

 Altererythrobacter fulvus Dahal and Kim 2018

 Altererythrobacter insulae Park et al. 2019
 Altererythrobacter ishigakiensis Matsumoto et al. 2011
 Altererythrobacter lauratis Yuan et al. 2017

 Altererythrobacter muriae Azpiazu-Muniozguren et al. 2021

 Altererythrobacter palmitatis Yuan et al. 2017
Altererythrobacter rigui Kang et al. 2016

 Altererythrobacter rubellus Yoon and Ryu 2020

 Altererythrobacter xiamenensis Lei et al. 2014

Provisional species
The following species names have been published, but not validated according to the Bacteriological Code:
 "Altererythrobacter flava" Zhang et al. 2021
 "Altererythrobacter segetis" Lee and Whang 2021
 "Altererythrobacter terrae" Srinivasan et al. 2016

References

Further reading 
 
 
 

Sphingomonadales
Bacteria genera